Wallis Heights  is a Canadian urban neighbourhood in Nova Scotia's Halifax Regional Municipality.

Wallis Heights is situated immediately north of Shannon Hill at the Northeastern end of the Bedford Basin, around the northern side of the  A. Murray MacKay Bridge, also known as 'the new bridge', in the former city of Dartmouth.  It was established by the Department of National Defence in the 1950s to house Royal Canadian Navy personnel attached to the Halifax naval base. The community is named after Provo Wallis.

Defence cutbacks to the Canadian Forces budget in the mid-1990s coupled with rising real estate maintenance costs saw Wallis Heights sold to a private developer.  Some units have been renovated and the entire neighbourhood has been resettled by civilians.

Transportation
Wallis Heights is served by a public bus route, Halifax Transit route 51. It runs seven days a week, linking Wallis Heights to the Bridge Terminal via Windmill Road.

References

Communities in Halifax, Nova Scotia
Military history of Nova Scotia
Naval history of Canada
Canadian Armed Forces
Dartmouth, Nova Scotia